Alan Waldron (born 6 September 1951) is an English former professional footballer who played as a midfielder in the Football League for Bolton Wanderers, Blackpool, Bury and York City, and in Australia for Wollongong City.

References

External links
Alan Waldron at Aussie Footballers

1951 births
Living people
People from Royton
Sportspeople from Lancashire
English footballers
Association football midfielders
National Soccer League (Australia) players
Bolton Wanderers F.C. players
Blackpool F.C. players
Bury F.C. players
York City F.C. players
Wollongong Wolves FC players
English Football League players